Robert Henry Goldsborough (January 4, 1779October 5, 1836) was an American politician from Talbot County, Maryland.

Early life
Goldsborough was born at "Myrtle Grove" near Easton, Maryland.  He was educated by private tutors and graduated from St. John's College in Annapolis, Maryland in 1795.

Career
Goldsborough engaged in agricultural pursuits, and also served as a member of the Maryland House of Delegates in 1804.  During the War of 1812, Goldsborough commanded a troop of horsemen in the Maryland Militia.

In 1813, Goldsborough was elected as a Federalist to the United States Senate to fill the vacancy in the term commencing March 4, 1813 caused by the failure of the legislature to elect a senator, and served from May 21, 1813 to March 3, 1819.  In the Senate, Goldsborough served as chairman of the Committee on Claims (Fifteenth Congress), and as a member of the Committee on the District of Columbia (Fifteenth Congress).

Goldsborough was elected a member of the American Antiquarian Society in 1814.

After his first term as Senator, Goldsborough resumed his agricultural pursuits.  He was instrumental in establishing the Easton Gazette in 1817, and again became a member of the House of Delegates in 1825.  He was again elected to the United States Senate as an Anti-Jacksonian National Republican (later Whig) to fill the vacancy caused by the resignation of Ezekiel F. Chambers, and served from January 13, 1835 until his death at "Myrtle Grove" near Easton.  In the Senate, Goldsborough served as chairman of the Committee on Commerce (Twenty-fourth Congress).

Death
He is interred at "Ashby", the family home in Talbot County.

See also
List of United States Congress members who died in office (1790–1899)

References

External links

1779 births
1836 deaths
People from Easton, Maryland
Goldsborough family
Federalist Party United States senators from Maryland
National Republican Party United States senators from Maryland
Members of the Maryland House of Delegates
Members of the American Antiquarian Society
American militia officers
American militiamen in the War of 1812